The Forthing Jingyi X6 is a Midsize Crossover sport utility vehicle positioned above the Forthing Jingyi X5 produced by Dongfeng Liuzhou Motor under the Forthing (Dongfeng Fengxing) sub-brand.

Overview

The Fengxing Jingyi X6 was offered as a more upmarket variant of the Fengxing SX6, featuring more powerful engines and a CVT as the automatic gearbox option. Being essentially a rebadged Dongfeng Fengxing SX6, the Fengxing Jingyi X6 is a seven-seater in a 2-2-3 seating configuration with prices ranging from 84,900 yuan to 109,900 yuan. Two engines are available for the Fengxing Jingyi X6, including a 1.5 liter inline-4 turbo engine producing 150hp and 200nm, and a 2.0 liter inline-4 engine producing 147hp and 200nm. The model was discontinued with 2017 being its last model year due to slow sales.

References

External links
Fengxing Jingyi X6 Official website

Compact MPVs
Crossover sport utility vehicles
2010s cars
Fengxing Jingyi X6
Cars introduced in 2016
Front-wheel-drive vehicles
Cars of China